James Mitchell (born 11 February 1995) is an English rugby union player. He primarily plays as a scrum-half. Mitchell plays for RFU Championship side Jersey Reds. Prior to this, he played with Sale Sharks  and Northampton Saints in Premiership Rugby and Pro14 side Connacht.

Mitchell made his professional debut for Sale Sharks against Worcester Warriors on 25 January 2014. During his time with the club he had loan spells with Chester and Rotherham Titans.

On 7 June 2017, it was announced that Mitchell, who qualifies to play for Ireland via his grandmother, had signed a two-year contract with Irish province Connacht. He made 26 appearances in two seasons with the side.

Mitchell joined Premiership Rugby side Northampton Saints on a short-term contract ahead of the 2019–20 season.

At conclusion of his contract with Northampton he joined RFU Championship side Doncaster Knights.

References

External links
EPCR profile
Premiership Rugby profile

1995 births
Living people
Connacht Rugby players
Doncaster Knights players
English rugby union players
Northampton Saints players
Rugby union players from Maidstone
Rugby union scrum-halves
Sale Sharks players
Jersey Reds players
English people of Northern Ireland descent